The 2012 United States Senate election in Tennessee took place on November 6, 2012, as part of the general election including the 2012 U.S. presidential election, elections to the House of Representatives and various state and local elections. Incumbent Republican U.S. Senator Bob Corker won a second term in a landslide, carrying all but two counties in the state.

Corker narrowly flipped reliably Democratic Davidson County, home to Nashville, which had not voted Republican on the presidential level since 1988. He faced Democratic nominee Mark E. Clayton as well as several third-party candidates and several independents in this election.

Corker easily won the Republican primary with 85% of the vote, and Clayton won the Democratic nomination with 30% of the vote, despite raising no money and having a website that was four years out of date. The next day Tennessee's Democratic Party disavowed the candidate over his active role in the Public Advocate of the United States, which they described as a "known hate group". They blamed his victory among candidates for whom the TNDP provided little forums to become known on the fact that his name appeared first on the ballot, and said they would do nothing to help his campaign, urging Democrats to vote for "the write-in candidate of their choice" in November. One of the Democratic candidates, Larry Crim, filed a petition seeking to offer the voters a new primary in which to select a Democratic nominee among the remaining candidates the party had affirmed as bona fide and as a preliminary motion sought a temporary restraining order against certification of the results, but after a judge denied the temporary order Crim withdrew his petition.

Background 
The incumbent in the race, former Chattanooga mayor Bob Corker, was elected in 2006 with 50.7% of the vote in a win against U.S. representative Harold Ford, Jr.

Republican primary

Candidates

Declared 
 Fred R. Anderson
 Mark Twain Clemens, unemployed
 Bob Corker, incumbent U.S. Senator
 James Durkan, businessman
 Brenda Lenard, businesswoman & doctoral student
 Zach Poskevich, technology consultant

Polling

Results

Democratic primary

Candidates

Declared 
 Mark E. Clayton, Vice President of the nonprofit organization Public Advocate of the United States and candidate for the U.S. Senate in 2008
 Larry Crim, nonprofit executive
 Gary Gene Davis
 Dave Hancock
 Park Overall, actress
 Thomas K. Owens
 Benjamin Roberts

Results

General election

Candidates 
 Bob Corker (Republican), incumbent U.S. Senator
 Mark E. Clayton (Democratic)
 Shaun Crowell (Libertarian)
 Martin Pleasant (Green)
 Kermit Steck (Constitution)
 David Gatchell (Independent)
 James Higdon (Independent)
 Michel Joseph Long (Independent)
 Troy Stephen Scoggin (Independent)
 Jacob Maurer (Write-In)

Predictions

Polling

Results 
Despite the TN Democratic Party encouraging write-in voting, the general election only saw 0.05% cast write-in votes. Clayton significantly underperformed compared to Barack Obama, running for re-election to the Presidency on the same day. He got about 9% and 254,827 votes fewer than the President.

See also 
 2012 United States Senate elections
 2012 United States House of Representatives elections in Tennessee

References

External links 
 Tennessee Department of Elections Board
 Campaign contributions at OpenSecrets.org
 Outside spending at Sunlight Foundation
 Candidate issue positions at On the Issues

Official campaign websites
 Bob Corker for U.S. Senate
 Mark Clayton for U.S. Senate
 Shaun Crowell for U.S. Senate
 David "None Of The Above" Gatchell
 Martin Pleasant for U.S. Senate
 Troy Stephen Scoggin for U.S. Senate
 Jacob Maurer for U.S. Senate

2012
Tennessee
Senate